Toronto FC II is a Canadian professional soccer team based in Toronto, Ontario, who play in MLS Next Pro, a third tier league of the United States soccer league system. It is the reserve team and minor league affiliate of Toronto FC as well as in partnership with Toronto FC Academy.

History

Pre-history
Upon their entrance into Major League Soccer, Toronto FC fielded their reserves in the MLS Reserve League from 2007 to 2013. In 2014, Toronto FC entered into a one-year partnership with the Wilmington Hammerheads of the USL to serve as their affiliate, with whom they would loan players to.

Formation
On November 20, 2014, Toronto FC announced the creation of a reserve team that would play in the third-tier United Soccer League under the name Toronto FC II. The team began play in March 2015, playing at the then-newly constructed 3,500-seat stadium at the Ontario Soccer Centre in Vaughan, just north-northwest of Toronto. They played their first match on June 27, 2015, against Wilmington Hammerheads. From 2017, the USL was sanctioned as a second-tier league.

On July 2, 2018, the team announced they would move down from the United Soccer League to USL League One for the league's first season in 2019. TFC II played in Saskatoon for the first SK Summer Soccer Series, which is hosted by the Saskatchewan Selects. The Selects defeated TFC II 2–0.

In July 2020, the team withdrew from the 2020 USL League One season, due to travel restrictions caused by the COVID-19 pandemic. They returned to the league in 2021, beginning the season at the Grande Sports World training facility in Casa Grande, Arizona, due to continued travel restrictions caused by the continuing pandemic. After playing their first three home games there, following three home games were played at Osceola Heritage Park in Kissimmee, Florida. Toronto FC II ultimately resumed playing their home games in Toronto on July 30, 2021, when they hosted Greenville Triumph SC at the BMO Training Ground.

MLS Next Pro
The club announced on December 6, 2021, that it was joining the 21-team MLS Next Pro for the inaugural 2022 season. In their debut season, they qualified for their first-ever playoff birth, after winning the Northeast Division. After defeating Philadelphia Union 2 in the Conference semi-finals, they were defeated by Columbus Crew 2 in extra time in the Conference finals.

Players and staff

Roster

Technical staff

Record

Coaches since 2015
  Jason Bent (2015–2017)
  Laurent Guyot (2018)
  Michael Rabasca (2018–2019)
  Mike Muñoz (2020–2021)
  Gianni Cimini (2022–present)

Stadium
The expansion Toronto FC II hosted their games at a new stadium constructed at the Ontario Soccer Centre beginning with the first season in 2015.  However, after the planned expansion of the OSC to 5,000 seats, which is a minimum requirement set by the United States Soccer Federation for the USL to be sanctioned as a division 2 league, did not materialize, the club announced that it would move its home games to BMO Field and Lamport Stadium beginning with the 2018 season.

In 2018, the team used Monarch Park Stadium for one game in May, relocated one game to Charlotte, and relocated another four games to Rochester's Marina Auto Stadium, while waiting on availability at Lamport Stadium.

With their drop to the division 3 USL League One for the 2019 season, the team moved their home games to BMO Training Ground.

On April 4, 2022, after the team left USL League One to join the newly formed MLS Next Pro, Toronto FC II announced that York Lions Stadium would serve as their new home stadium, while also playing 2 home games at BMO Field as a second match of a double header with their parent club, Toronto FC.

See also
 Toronto FC Academy

References

External links
 
 Official website

 
Maple Leaf Sports & Entertainment
MLS Next Pro teams
Former USL Championship teams
Association football clubs established in 2014
2014 establishments in Ontario
Canadian reserve soccer teams
Former USL League One teams
Expatriated football clubs